Sally Storey is an architectural lighting designer based in the United Kingdom. She is most notable for her lighting design work on many luxury hotels, offices, and residences of historical significance around the world, such as The Berkeley (London), Claridge's (London), Four Seasons Hotel George V (Paris), Hotel Hermitage (Monaco), The Alpina Gstaad (Switzerland), and The Ritz-Carlton, Hong Kong.

Other notable  buildings that Storey has worked on include the Temple Church, Lord's Cricket Ground, Skibo Castle, Dundrum Castle, CityPoint, Hammerson, Grosvenor Place, and Lumiere.

Education and career
Storey studied architecture at the University of Bristol during the early 1980s, and then worked with lighting designer John Cullen, whom she met during her second year at university. After Cullen died in 1986, Storey became the Design Director at John Cullen Lighting, and also Design Director of Lighting Design International.

Storey has worked on many notable buildings across Europe, including:

The Berkeley hotel in London
Claridge's hotel in London
Four Seasons Hotel George V in Paris, France
Hotel Hermitage in Monaco
Coral Reef Club, Barbados
The Ritz-Carlton, Hong Kong
London Heathrow Airport VIP Lounge
Cap Ferrat resort, French Riviera, France
The Savoy Hotel in London
The Alpina Gstaad in Switzerland

Additional buildings that Storey and her companies have worked on:

Historic buildings
Temple Church
Lord's Cricket Ground
Royal Geographical Society
Bell Court
Skibo Castle
Dundrum Castle
Whatley Manor
One Aldwych
Seaham Hall
Theo Fennell
Veeraswamy

Hotels, spas, and resorts
Hotel Cafe Royal
The Principal Edinburgh George Street
The Principal Manchester
Hotel Imperial
Hotel Grande Bretagne
Grand-Hôtel du Cap-Ferrat
Sandy Lane
Grande Bretagne
Threadneedles Hotel

Offices
CityPoint
Hammerson
Grosvenor Place
Lumiere
Morgan Sindall
Morgan Stanley Dean Witter

Other projects that Storey had worked on include various superyachts and historical castles, such as in the Loire Valley of France. Storey also helps design creative lighting schemes in commercial buildings and residences in North America, Europe, the Middle East and across Asia, including in Dubai, Mumbai, and other Asian cities.

Storey's major influences include Sir John Soane, who early on discovered the power of light, and designers such as Jonathan Reed, with a design style focusing on simplicity.

Personal life
Storey lives in Kensington, London with her husband, publisher Christopher Fordham, and their three children.

Publications
Storey's publications are:

References

External links
Lighting Design International
John Cullen Lighting

Living people
Lighting designers
British designers
Alumni of the University of Bristol
Year of birth missing (living people)